Groupe Desgagnés is a Canadian shipping firm. It operates a fleet of nineteen vessels. Gross earnings in 2014 were around $230 million.

Desgagnes Transarctik
Desgagnes Transarctik, a subsidiary of Groupe Desgagnés, is partners with Arctic Co-operatives Limited, the Qikiqtaaluk Corporation, Sakku Investments Corporation and the Kitikmeot Corporation. Operating as Nunavut Sealink and Supply Incorporated they provide annual sealift to Canadian Arctic communities.

Fleet

All vessels fly the Canadian flag and are operated by Canadian crews, except a few vessels when used for international trade.  was part of the fleet until her sale in 2007.

Tankers 
They have ice class Polar 7.
 : chemical tanker
 Espada Desgagnés and Laurentia Desgagnés: Panamax tanker vessels for the transportation of crude oil. 
 Esta Desgagnés: chemical tanker
 Gaïa Desgagnés: chemical product carrier
 Jana Desgagnés
 Laurentia Desgagnés: a Panamax tanker vessel dedicated to the transportation of crude oil
 Maria Desgagnés: a double-hulled tanker for transporting chemicals
 Sarah Desgagnés: double-hulled oil and chemical tanker built in Tuzla, Turkey in 2007.
 : double-hulled oil and asphalt tanker, no longer in use, replaced by Damia Desgagnés and Mia Desgagnés.

Cargo carriers 
 : multi-purpose dry cargo ship
 : general cargo carrier rated Lloyd's 100 1A for navigation through ice. (No longer active since 2017)
 : multi-purpose roll-on/roll-off vessel equipped with a crane capable of lifting up to 125 tons (Sold and scrapped in 2017)
 : general cargo ship, heavy cargo
  roll-on/roll-off cargo carrier (Sold in December 2017 and bound for further service in Russia)
 : heavy lift multi-purpose dry cargo vessel with tweendeck
 
 

 : multi-purpose heavy lift ship
 : multi-purpose dry cargo ship
 : multi-purpose dry cargo ship, equipped for carriage of containers, strengthened for heavy cargo
 : multi-purpose tweendeck, lo-lo cargo ship
 : multi-purpose dry cargo ship
 
 : sister ship of Sedna Desgagnés, multi-purpose dry cargo ship, equipped for carriage of containers, strengthened for heavy cargo

Cargo and passenger carrier 

 Bella Desgagnés: From mid-April to mid-January, Bella Desgagnés serves the Lower North shore of the Côte-Nord region of Quebec transporting passengers and cargo. The trip from Rimouski to Blanc-Sablon is a one-week round trip, calling (in the downstream direction) at Sept-Îles, Port-Menier on Anticosti Island, Havre-Saint-Pierre, Natashquan, Kegaska, La Romaine, Harrington Harbour, Tête-à-la-Baleine, La Tabatière and Saint-Augustin.The voyage downstream starts Tuesday morning from Rimouski and arrives in Blanc Sablon Friday morning. The ship then returns upstream.
 Nordik Express.

References

External links
 Map showing the real time position of the vessels in the fleet

Shipping companies of Canada
Companies based in Quebec City